Lament For The Numb is a 1993 album by New Zealand singer-songwriter Dave Dobbyn and an outfit he named The Stone People—album producer Mitchell Froom on keyboards and bassist and drummer Bruce Thomas  and Pete Thomas from Elvis Costello's rhythm section.  The album was recorded and mixed by Tchad Blake at the Sunset Sound Factory in Hollywood. Dobbyn felt that the album was "edgy", but his record company initially called it 'unreleasable', and its release was delayed by a year.

Track listing

Personnel
 Dave Dobbyn – vocals, guitar, piano
 Mitchell Froom – keyboards
 Bruce Thomas – bass
 Pete Thomas – drums, percussion

References

External links
 'The Black Album', Nick Bollanger 1994 NZ Listener review 

Dave Dobbyn albums
1993 albums